Girlevik Waterfalls are situated 29 km south-east of Erzincan in Turkey. In the years 1950–1953, the State Hydraulic Works (DSI) built a hydroelectric power plant at its lower section of 3,040 KW. When the third group was added in 1965, the water capacity of the Gürlevik power station rose to 3*866 1/sec. The Gürlevik waters fall from a travertine platform in a disorderly fashion.

References

Waterfalls of Turkey
Landforms of Erzincan Province